"Vanka" is an 1886 short story by Anton Chekhov.

Publication
The story was first published in Peterburgskaya Gazetas No. 354 (25 December; new style: 7 January 1887), 1886 issue, in the Christmas Stories section, signed A. Chekhonte (А. Чехонте).

In a slightly revised version, it was included into the 1888 collection Stories (Рассказы, Saint Petersburg) and appeared unchanged in all of its 1888–1899 re-issues. It made its way into the compilations Children (Детвора, 1889) to be reproduced unchanged in its second and third (1890, 1895) editions. In 1900, with unauthorized cuts, it appeared in a children's reader Zolotyie Kolosya (Golden Spikes). Chekhov included the story into Volume 4 of his Collected Works published by Adolf Marks in 1899–1901.

Synopsis
A nine-year-old boy is in desperate need to convince his grandfather, his only relative (a wayward character, who seems to be totally indifferent to the boy's fate), to take him back to his country home. Stealthily, he writes a letter to describe the unbearable life he leads in the house of the shoemaker Aliakhin, whom he serves as an apprentice for, suffering from hunger, abuse and humiliation. Finally, very pleased with his effort, he puts it into an envelope, inscribes the address: "The village, to my grandfather, Konstantin Makarych" and drops it into a post-box, well aware that it is upon this precious item that his whole life now totally depends.

Influence on language
The phrase “The village, to grandfather” (Russian: на деревню дедушке) from the story became an idiomatic expression, which refers to sending something to inaccurate, incomplete, unclear, questionable, or non-existent address, where it will not be delivered or answered.

Notes

References

External links
 Ванька, the original Russian text
 Vanka, the English translation

Short stories by Anton Chekhov
1886 short stories
Works about child labour
Works about poverty